A genos was a type of social group in ancient Greece.

Genos may also refer to:

Geno's Steaks, a restaurant in Philadelphia
Génos, Haute-Garonne, a French commune in the Haute-Garonne department
Génos, Hautes-Pyrénées, a French commune in the Hautes-Pyrénées department
 Genos, a character in the web comic manga series One-Punch Man

See also
Geno (disambiguation)